Heritage Academy is a traditional public charter high school in central Mesa, Arizona serving grades 7-12. It opened in 1995 as one of the first charter schools in the state.

History 
Founded in 1995 by Earl Taylor Jr. this public charter high school was one of the first schools granted a charter in Arizona after the passing of the Arizona Revised Statutes Title 15 section 181–183 in 1994. Located in Historic Downtown Mesa, this school has since opened three additional campuses in Laveen, Queen Creek, and Maricopa Arizona.

In 2016, Americans United for Separation of Church and State filed a federal lawsuit against the school, claiming that the Heritage Academy schools violated the First Amendment, the Arizona Constitution, and Arizona state laws through its student instruction and required reading. Specifically, the AUSCS claimed that the school was teaching Taylor's belief that the Ten Commandments must be obeyed in order to attain happiness.  It was also claimed that the school used listed as required reading two textbooks written by W. Cleon Skousen, a Mormon theologian who was closely associated with the  far-right John Birch Society, and was eventually officially "shunned" by the Church of Jesus Christ of Latter-day Saints.  The complaint also stated that teachers in the school taught religious principles, for instance denying evolution in science classes, and saying that enjoying rock music will inevitably lead to addiction to drugs and alcohol.

References

External links 
 Heritage Academy Mesa – Official Heritage Academy Mesa Website

Public high schools in Arizona
High schools in Mesa, Arizona
Charter schools in Arizona